Ardea is a genus of herons. These herons are generally large in size, typically 80–100 cm or more in length.

These large herons are associated with wetlands where they prey on fish, frogs, and other aquatic species. Most members of this almost worldwide group breed colonially in trees, building large stick nests.

Northern species such as great blue, grey, and purple herons may migrate south in winter, although the first two do so only from areas where the waters freeze.

Description 

These are powerful birds with large spear-like bills, long necks and long legs, which hunt by waiting motionless or stalking their prey in shallow water before seizing it with a sudden lunge. They have a slow steady flight, with the neck retracted as is characteristic of herons and bitterns; this distinguishes them from storks, cranes, flamingos, and spoonbills, which extend their necks.

Taxonomy 
The genus Ardea was introduced in 1758 by the Swedish naturalist Carl Linnaeus in 1758 in the tenth edition of his Systema Naturae. The genus name comes from the Latin word  ardea  meaning "heron". The type species was designated as the grey heron (Ardea cinerea) by George Robert Gray in 1840.

Some members of Ardea are clearly very closely related, such as the grey, great blue, and cocoi herons, which form a superspecies. However, the great egret, in particular, has been placed in other genera by various authors as Egretta alba and Casmerodius albus. Nevertheless, this species closely resembles the large Ardea herons in everything but color, whereas it shows fewer similarities to the smaller white egrets.

Species 
The genus contains twelve species:

A number of Ardea species are only known from subfossil or fossil bones. Their placement in Ardea versus Egretta may be provisional:
 Bennu heron, Ardea bennuides (prehistoric)
 Ardea sp. (Middle Miocene of Observation Quarry, US) (fossil)
 Ardea sp. (Late Miocene of Love Bone Bed, US) (fossil)
 Ardea polkensis (Early Pliocene of Bone Valley, US) (fossil)
 Ardea sp. (Early Pleistocene of Macasphalt Shell Pit, US) (fossil)
 Ardea howardae (fossil)

The remains described as Ardea perplexa are nowadays usually believed to be from an ibis of the genus Geronticus or closely related genera. "Ardea formosa" (a nomen nudum) is now Proardeola, "Ardea" brunhuberi and "A." similis refer to a misidentified cormorant (Phalacrocorax intermedius) and partridge (Miogallus altus), respectively. "Ardea" lignitum – a fossil of quite recent age as it seems – is some large owl, perhaps even a Eurasian eagle-owl (Bubo bubo).

References

 
Bird genera
Herons
Extant Miocene first appearances
Taxa named by Carl Linnaeus